Sierra Marie Swan (born April 5, 1978) is an American musician. She is known for her work with Dollshead, Black Eyed Peas and as a solo artist.

Biography

Early life
Swan is the daughter of 1970s country and pop musician Billy Swan, who played rhythm guitar for Kris Kristofferson. She was born in Los Angeles, California, in April 1978. Swan's love of music started at an early age. During her many nights backstage while her father played, she decided to become a professional musician. As a teenager, Sierra listened to Prince, Queen, Oingo Boingo, The Beatles, Grant Lee Buffalo, Mozart and Patsy Cline. It was Patsy Cline who inspired her singing career. Swan also had influences from Tori Amos.

Career
When she was sixteen Swan began playing at coffeehouses in Los Angeles. At eighteen she got a residency in Hollywood at Goldfinger's.

In 1997, Swan got together with Graham Edwards and Dollshead was formed. The band was signed and eventually dropped from MCA. After Dollshead, Swan was a member of The Black Eyed Peas from 1998–2000, featuring on the song "Fallin' Up".

After leaving the Black Eyed Peas she went solo. Swan was discovered by Anne Previn and Scott Cutler of Ednaswap. She wrote several songs with Previn and Cutler. In 2001, she was signed to Atlantic Records.

She has released various albums and EPs since 2006.

She completed the Queen Of The Valley LP, which was originally titled Queen of the Valley Girls. However, she was dropped from her label which delayed release until 2008. The LP featured such producers as Chad Hugo of The Neptunes and Linda Perry (formerly of the musical group 4 Non Blondes).

Linda Perry worked with Swan on her next (and officially, her first) album, Ladyland in 2006. The album included a duet with singer-songwriter Aimee Mann, titled "Get Down to It" and features additional production work by Bill Bottrell. Linda Perry has quoted the following about Swan. "Beautiful, erotic, mesmerizing is everything that comes to mind when listening to Sierra Swan. Her voice will take you on an emotional journey."

Swan released an EP entitled Coward, available on iTunes only, in 2007. She has subsequently released songs via her Web site or via MySpace. 
Her albums are available on iTunes.

Swan has also toured and collaborated with Dave Stewart, Ringo Starr, and Frank Black.

In 2014 she released Good Soldier on February 25 which was produced by Billy Corgan of The Smashing Pumpkins.

She played with The Smashing Pumpkins on their 2016 in Plainsong tour, singing and playing various instruments.

In 2018 Swan collaborated once again with Chad Hugo for a 5 track EP titled Caterwaul

Discography
LadyLand (2006)
"Copper Red"
"Don't Say"
"Get Down to It" (featuring Aimee Mann)
"Dr. Loveboy"
"The Ladder"
"Ladyland"
"Trouble Is"
"Lucky Scar"
"Shakedown"
"Just Tell Me"
"Mother"

Coward (2007)
"Coward"
"Same Ol' Way"
"Bring Me In"
"Depression"
"Empty of You"
"Ramona"

Queen of the Valley (2008)
"So Much Fun"
"Seasons"
"Prelude to Sex"
"Sex Is Keeping Us Together"
"Nuclear Letdown"
"Distraction"
"You Got Away" (ft. Scooter Ward)
"Unforgivable"
"Demise of Love"
"Sleeping Beauty"
"Obvious Day"
"Rock and Roll Dance"
"You Got Away" (ft. Scooter Ward – Demo version)
"You Got Away"

Girl Who Cried Wolf (2009)
"I Will Follow"
"Girl Who Cried Wolf"
"Who Am I"
"End of You"
"Deep Wound"
"The Truth Is..."
"Mansion Crew"
"Oh You"
"In My Room"
"Untitled"
"Blame"

Good Soldier (2014)
"Black Eyed"  – 4:40
"Emotional"  – 3:20
"Little Shoes"  – 4:30
"Take Me Out to the Ballgame"  – 4:23
"Mother Nature"  – 4:43
"Make a Happy Home"  – 3:52
"The Day"  – 3:50
"Sad Affair"  – 4:20
"I Feel" (feat. Carina Round)  – 5:14
"No Matter How Much"  – 4:28

Album Produced by Billy Corgan, Engineered and Mixed by Bjorn Thorsrud

Caterwaul (EP) (2018)
"Caterwaul"
"Duel Of The FarewellMeNots"
"Purple Forever"
"Rusted Girl"
"System Breaker"

EP Produced by Chad Hugo

Guest vocals
Swan is credited with Guest Vocals on the following albums:
 Cyr by The Smashing Pumpkins
 ATUM: A Rock Opera in Three Acts by The Smashing Pumpkins
 Ogilala by Billy Corgan ("Processional")
 ...Is a Real Boy by Say Anything 
 Infinite Motion by T-Tauri  
 Two Angels and a Dream by Depswa, on the song "Traveler's Song"
 From There to Here by John Oszajca 
 Fast Man Raider Man by Frank Black 
 13 Ways to Bleed On Stage by Cold, on the songs "No One" & "Witch"
 Year of the Spider by Cold, on the song "Suffocate"
 Fallin Up by The Black Eyed Peas

References

External links

 
 Sierra Swan interview
 
 Exclusive: Billy Corgan and Sierra Swan talk new album Good Soldier Music Radar
 Sierra Swan – Good Soldier on spfc.org

1978 births
Custard Records artists
American contraltos
Living people
20th-century American singers
21st-century American singers
20th-century American women singers
21st-century American women singers